Prospero is the protagonist of  The Tempest, a play by William Shakespeare.

Prospero may also refer to:

Entertainment
 Prospero (band), a Canadian industrial rock/noise band
 Prospero Productions, an Australian-based television production company
 Prince Prospero, the protagonist of Edgar Allan Poe's "The Masque of the Red Death"
 Prospero, the wizard protagonist of John Bellairs' novel The Face in the Frost
 Prospero, the home planet of the Thousand Sons traitor legion in Warhammer 40,000
Prospero, a canceled video game by Valve Corporation

People
 Philip Prospero, Prince of Asturias (1657–1661), Spanish heir apparent and son of Philip IV of Spain and Mariana of Austria
 Pope Benedict XIV (1675–1758), born Prospero Lorenzo Lambertini
 Prospero Alpini (1553–1617), Venetian physician and botanist
 Prospero Amatong (1931–2009), Philippine politician and former member of the House of Representatives
 Prospero Caterini (1795–1881), Italian Roman Catholic cardinal
 Prospero Colonna (1452–1523), Italian condottiere
 Prospero Colonna (cardinal) (died 1463), cardinal-nephew of Pope Martin V
 Prospero Colonna (politician), mayor of Rome in 1899–1904
 Prospero Colonna di Sciarra (1707–1765), Italian cardinal
 Prospero Fagnani (died 1678), Italian canon lawyer
 Prospero Farinacci (1554–1618), Italian lawyer and judge, noted for his harsh sentencing
 Prospero Fontana (1512–1597), Italian painter of the late Renaissance
 Prospero Gallinari (1951–2013), Italian terrorist and member of the Red Brigades
 Prospero Grech (1925–2019), Augustinian friar and cardinal
 Prospero Intorcetta (1626–1696), Jesuit missionary in China
 Prospero Nograles (1947–2019), Speaker of the House of Representatives of the Philippines
 Prospero Pichay Jr. (born 1950), Philippine politician and former member of the Philippine House of Representatives
 Prospero Rabaglio, late 16th-century Italian painter
 Prospero Santacroce (1514–1589), Italian Roman Catholic bishop and cardinal
 Prospero Spani (1516–1584), Italian sculptor a.k.a. Prospero Clementi, Prospero Clemente or il Clemente
 Prospero Zannichelli (1698–1772), Italian painter
 Próspero Fernández Oreamuno (1834–1885), President of Costa Rica (1882–1885)
 Próspero París (1846–1931), French Roman Catholic prelate and Apostolic Vicar of Nanking
 Próspero Penados del Barrio (1925–2005), Guatemalan Roman Catholic prelate and Archbishop of Guatemala City
 San Prospero di Reggio Emilia a.k.a. Prosper of Reggio (died 466 AD), Italian saint

Science and technology
 PROX1, which stands for Prospero homeobox protein 1
 Prospero (file system), a global file system based on the Virtual System Model
 Prospero (moon), a moon of the planet Uranus
 Prospero (plant), a genus of plants in the family Asparagaceae
 Prospero (satellite), launched by the United Kingdom in 1971
 PROSPERO, a database for the prospective registration of studies in medicine, social care, welfare, crime, justice and international development studies

Other
 Prospero, California, an unincorporated community
Prospero (mountain), mountain in Australia
 HMS Prospero

See also
 Prosper (disambiguation)
 Prospero Colonna (disambiguation)